Abstract management is the process of accepting and preparing abstracts for presentation at an academic conference. The process consists of either invited or proffered submissions of the abstract or summary of work. The abstract typically states the hypothesis, tools used in research or investigation, data collected, and a summary or interpretation of the data.

The abstracts usually undergo peer review after which they are accepted or rejected by the conference chair or committee and then allocated to conference sessions. The abstracts may be presented as an oral talk or as an illustrated poster during the event. Abstracts are often published before or after the event as conference proceedings or in academic journals or online. In some cases submission of a full paper may be required before final acceptance is given. In some fields (e.g., computer science), most mainstream conferences and workshops ask for the submission of full papers (rather than just abstracts) and academic program committees peer review the full paper to a standard comparable to journal publication before accepting a paper for presentation at the conference and publishing it in an edited proceedings series.

The abstract management process is closely tied to the need to provide continuing education to professionals, especially  continuing medical education. Many annual meetings hosted by specialty societies provide educational credit hours so that attendees may keep current in the field and maintain their professional certifications.

Software 
Historically, abstract management was a time-consuming manual process requiring the handling of large amounts of paper and created a considerable administrative workload. An increasing number of organizations now use web-based abstract management software to streamline and automate the process. The work is sometimes outsourced to dedicated conference departments at major publishers and professional conference organisers.

A conference management system is web-based software that supports the organization of conferences especially scientific conferences. It helps the program chair(s), the conference organizers, the authors and the reviewers in their respective activities.

A conference management system can be regarded as a domain-specific content management system. Similar systems are used today by editors of scientific journals such as EDAS.

Functionality

Software functionality is based around typical conference workflows. These vary in detail, but in broad terms they must include a submission phase (usually abstract submission but sometimes full papers), reviewing, decision making by the programme committee, building of the conference programme and publishing of the programme and the abstracts or papers (online, in print or on a CD-ROM or other digital medium).

Abstract submission involves the authors in preparing their abstracts and sending them to the conference organisers through an online form, and is a relatively straightforward process. The abstracts are either uploaded as documents (typically Microsoft Word, PDF or LaTeX) or, where graphics and tables are not required, they may simply be entered into the form as plain text. The software will send out an email acknowledgement. Following the committee's decisions on which abstracts are to be accepted for the conference the submission software may also be used to collect full papers and PowerPoint presentations.

Online reviewing may be more complex as the process is frequently “blinded” or anonymised. Reviewers will have particular interests or specialisations which should be taken into account when assigning abstracts to them, and they may have conflicts of interest. Reviews must be independent, i.e.  reviewers should not be able to see other reviews before they have submitted their own. Abstract management software must provide for these options.

The programme committee will require extensive reporting and access to the abstracts and reviews. Software will usually support ranking of reviews and setting an acceptance threshold.
Some software products provide further functionality for the conference organisers. This often includes an email facility to report reviewers' comments and committee decisions to authors, programme building tools and online publishing.

Delegate registration is usually provided separately from abstract management.

References 

Academic publishing
Academic conferences
 

ru:Система управления конференцией